Patrick Christopher Terrell (born March 18, 1968 in Memphis, Tennessee) is a former American football safety in the NFL for the Los Angeles Rams, New York Jets, Carolina Panthers, and Green Bay Packers. He played college football at the University of Notre Dame.

He is perhaps best remembered for his efforts in preserving a victory for the Fighting Irish during their 1988 National Championship season. In a game billed as the "Catholics vs. Convicts", #1 Miami pulled to within one point with a touchdown with less than one minute to go in the fourth quarter, making the score 31-30. Miami coach Jimmy Johnson made the decision to go for the two-point conversion, and called for a pass play to the right corner of the endzone. Terrell batted away Steve Walsh's pass at the last possible instant, sealing the victory for the Irish, and helping them roll onward to a 12-0 season and the national crown.

He and Chad Cota both had 49-yard interception returns against Dallas in the first round of the 1996 playoffs, thereby tying each other for the career, season, and single-game Panthers' franchise records for post-season interception return yards.

1968 births
Living people
People from Memphis, Tennessee
American football safeties
Notre Dame Fighting Irish football players
Los Angeles Rams players
New York Jets players
Carolina Panthers players
Green Bay Packers players